Mar Elias (Aramaic 'Saint Elias' or 'Lord Elias') may refer to:

 Elijah (alternate spelling of Elias), a prophet of the Hebrew Bible or Old Testament and the Qur'an
 Mar Elias Educational Institutions, a set of Educational Institutes in Ibillin, Israel
 Mar Elias Monastery, a Greek Orthodox Monastery between Jerusalem and Bethlehem
 Mar Elias refugee camp, a Palestinian refugee camp in Lebanon, near Beirut
 Dair Mar Elia, Saint Elias Monastery in Iraq
 Patriarch Elias of Antioch, Syriac Orthodox Patriarch Elias I, 709–723 CE, known as Mar Elias
 Tell Mar Elias, an archaeological site near Ajlun, Jordan
 Mar Elias and Mar Elias el Tiffeh, archaeological sites in the Sands of Beirut

See also
 Saint Elias (disambiguation)